KEAD was the callsign for two defunct American Forces Radio and Television Service radio stations on Wake Island, an unorganized, unincorporated territory of the United States. On  AM, the station carried a mix of free-form live programming hosted by military personnel and other workers stationed on the island, while on KEAD-FM , the station played pre-recorded easy-listening music off reel-to-reel tapes. The KEAD callsign was previously assigned to the Civil Aeronautics Authority navigation service station based on the island.

In 2011, some 9,000 vintage vinyl records provided by AFRTS to the station from the mid-1960s into the 1970s were discovered in the old studio in a restricted area of the Wake Island Airfield terminal building.

References 

Defunct radio stations in the United States
Wake Island
American Forces Network
Radio stations in the United States by insular area